May 13 - Eastern Orthodox Church calendar - May 15

All fixed commemorations below celebrated on May 27 by Orthodox Churches on the Old Calendar.

For May 14th, Orthodox Churches on the Old Calendar commemorate the Saints listed on May 1.

Saints
 Martyr Maximus, under Decius (250)
 Martyr Isidore of Chios (251)
 Saints Alexander, Barbaras, and Acolythus (Acolouthus), martyred at the Church of St Irene (Holy Peace), near the sea in Constantinople
 Martyrs Aristotle and Leandros
 Hieromartyr Therapont, Bishop of Cyprus (3rd century)
 Saint Boniface of Tarsus, martyr (307)
 Venerable Serapion the Sindonite, monk of Egypt (5th century)

Pre-Schism Western saints
 Martyrs Justa, Justina and Henedina, in Sardinia (c. 130)
 Saint Pontius of Cimiez (Pons de Cimiez), martyred in Cimella (Cimiez) near Nice, whose relics gave his name to the town of Saint-Pons. (c. 258) 
 Saint Aprunculus (Apruncule), first bishop of Langres, later of Clermont, Gaul (c. 488)
 Saint Boniface, Bishop of Ferentino in Tuscany (6th century)
 Saint Carthage (Carthach Mochuda) the Younger, founder and first abbot of Lismore (637)
 Saint Erembert, Bishop of Toulouse (657)
 Saint Tuto (Totto), monk and Abbot of St Emmeram in Regensburg in Germany, where he later became bishop (930)
 Saint Hallvard, Of the royal family of Norway, Patron-saint of Oslo, martyr (1043)

Post-Schism Orthodox saints
 Saint Nicetas, Bishop of Novgorod and recluse of the Kiev Caves (1108) 
 Patriarch Leontius II of Jerusalem, Greek Orthodox Patriarch of Jerusalem (1190)
 Saint Isidore of Rostov, Fool-for-Christ and Wonderworker (1474)
 New Martyr Mark of Crete, at Smyrna (1643)
 New Martyr John of Bulgaria (Raiko-John of Shumena), the goldsmith (1802)
 Saint Andrew, abbot of Raphael (Tobolsk) (1820)

New martyrs and confessors
 New Hieromartyr Peter Rozhdestvin, Priest (1939)

Other commemorations
 Commemoration of the martyrdom by the Poles (1609), of: 
 Abbot Anthony with 40 monks and 1,000 laymen of the St. Paisius of Uglich Monastery,
 Abbot Daniel with 30 monks and 200 laymen of the St. Nicholas Monastery (Kostroma) 
 Commemoration of Victor Chornayiv, Archimandrite of the Annunciation Monastery at Nizhyn (1761)
 Synaxis of the Yaroslavsk (Pechersk) Icon of the Mother of God (1823)
 First uncovering of the relics (1846) of Saint Tikhon, Bishop of Voronezh, Wonderworker of Zadonsk (1783)

Icon gallery

Notes

References

Sources
 May. Self-Ruled Antiochian Orthodox Christian Archdiocese of North America.
 May 14/27. Orthodox Calendar (PRAVOSLAVIE.RU).
 May 27 / May 14. HOLY TRINITY RUSSIAN ORTHODOX CHURCH (A parish of the Patriarchate of Moscow).
 May 14. OCA - The Lives of the Saints.
 Dr. Alexander Roman. May. Calendar of Ukrainian Orthodox Saints (Ukrainian Orthodoxy - Українське Православ'я).
 May 14. Latin Saints of the Orthodox Patriarchate of Rome.
 May 14. The Roman Martyrology.
Greek Sources
 Great Synaxaristes:  14 ΜΑΪΟΥ. ΜΕΓΑΣ ΣΥΝΑΞΑΡΙΣΤΗΣ.
  Συναξαριστής. 14 Μαΐου. ECCLESIA.GR. (H ΕΚΚΛΗΣΙΑ ΤΗΣ ΕΛΛΑΔΟΣ). 
Russian Sources
  27 мая (14 мая). Православная Энциклопедия под редакцией Патриарха Московского и всея Руси Кирилла (электронная версия). (Orthodox Encyclopedia - Pravenc.ru).
  14 мая (ст.ст.) 27 мая 2013 (нов. ст.). Русская Православная Церковь Отдел внешних церковных связей. (DECR).

May in the Eastern Orthodox calendar